Ruth Teichman (born January 2, 1943) is a former Republican member of the Kansas Senate, representing the 33rd district from 2001 to 2013.  She was previously a member of the Stafford Board of Education for 20 years.

A farmer and a banker from Stafford, she is married to Dennis Teichman.

Committee assignments
Teichman served on these legislative committees:
 Financial Institutions and Insurance (chair)
 Natural Resources (vice-chair)
 Education
 Organization, Calendar and Rules
 Joint Committee on Pensions, Investments and Benefits
 Ways and Means

Major donors
Some of the top contributors to Teichman's 2008 campaign, according to the National Institute on Money in State Politics:
 Ruth Teichman (self-finance), Kansas Association of Realtors, Koch Industries, Kansas National Education Association, Kansas Hospital Association, American Family Insurance, Farmers Insurance Group

Financial, insurance and real estate companies were her largest donor group.

Elections
Teichman was defeated by Mitch Holmes by a 7,635-6,762 margin in the Republican Primary on Aug. 7, 2012. Seven of eight moderate state senate Republicans, including Morris, targeted by the Koch brothers, were defeated in the 2012 Republican primary, giving incumbent Governor Sam Brownback the margin he needed to effectively restructure state taxation, exempting "S" status filers such as Koch Industries from income taxes.

References

External links
Kansas Senate Biography
Project Vote Smart profile
 Campaign contributions: 2000, 2002, 2004, 2006, 2008
 Teichman's website

Republican Party Kansas state senators
Living people
School board members in Kansas
People from Stafford, Kansas
Women state legislators in Kansas
1943 births
21st-century American politicians
21st-century American women politicians